The House of Zinaida Ushkova is a building in Kazan, in the Republic of Tatarstan, Russia, which was reconstructed in the beginning of the 20th century in an eclectic style. It is an impressive sight in the city center and an object of Russian heritage. In 1919 it became a central building of the National Library of the Republic of Tatarstan and is now open to visitors and tourists.

History 

Alexey Ushkov, son of the K.K. Ushkov - owner of chemical plants and grandson of tea magnate A.S. Gubkin married Zinaida Vysockaya - daughter of Nikolay Vysockiy - professor of surgery, during his student times in Kazan State University.
As a wedding gift for his wife, Alexey ordered plan reconstruction of the house in Kazan at Voskresenskaya street in Kazan (nowadays Lobachevskaya street) and house in Moscow (Ermolov House ar Prechistenka, 20)  to structural architect Karl Mufke. There is no accurate data about who worked on reconstruction of the house in Moscow. Reconstruction of Kazan buildings Karl Mufke leaded himself. Both buildings performed in mixed style with predominance of baroque and Empire styles.

House of Ushkova had been reconstructed during 1904-1908 (by other sources at 1903-1907) from three buildings located at Voskresenskaya street. Architect was so engaged into his work that sometimes might forgout about his security. Newspapers of that time write that once he fell down from falseworks and broke two of his ribs but got up and continued his work.

Main part of the premises was demised for living and commerce. For example all ground floor was demised for the shops.

After October Revolution property of Ushkov family was expropriated. In 1919 House of Ushkova became a central building of National Library of the Republic of Tatarstan - one of the biggest libraries of Volga region.

Initial house planning and interior finishing well preserved.

Interesting facts 
Zinaida and Alexey broke up after three years of marriage. Alexey got married second time to Alexandra Balashova, prima ballerina of Bolshoi Theater.

Buildings and structures in Kazan
Tourist attractions in Tatarstan
Cultural heritage monuments of federal significance in Tatarstan